Chaudhary Devi Lal University, named after Chaudhary Devi Lal, the former Deputy Prime Minister of India was established by the Government of Haryana on 2 April 2003. The University has 24 academic departments, which offer 21 career oriented and specialized courses to the students. It also offers job-oriented courses through distance education.

University history and facilities
Established on 2nd April, 2003, CDLU, Sirsa is named after Jan Nayak Chaudhary Devi Lal, the former Deputy Prime Minister of India and the former Chief Minister of Haryana. This University, set up by the Government of Haryana under Act 9 of 2003 passed by the State Legislature, has a sprawling campus of 213 Acre, 4 Kanal, 12 Marla at Barnala Road, Sirsa. 

The university has four Teaching Blocks, well-equipped labs, Vivekananda Library, five well-furnished hostels for boys and girls, Media Centre with a Community Radio Station, a majestic Multi Purpose Hall and auditorium, Shopping complex, University Health Centre and the branch of a nationalized bank, Guest House, Vice Chancellor‘s residence and 144 houses for the teaching and non-teaching staff. Fourth teaching block is near completion, besides extension of other buildings. 

The main objective of the University is to facilitate, promote and excel in Higher Education, Research and Consultancy in the conventional as well as emerging areas of knowledge. To enhance the standard of higher education and increase the research activities the University has been connected to National Knowledge Network (NKN) provided through one GBPS (optical fiber) dedicated line under NMEICT project of Ministry of HRD India. Wi-Fi facility has also been provided in the University campus. During the lock down and in the post lock down period the university has adopted online mode of teaching. The process of admission is also online and to ensure the health hazards of the prospective students, the admission process has been simplified and it is expected that the students will be self-accountable in furnishing the relevant information and will enter into academic programmes in full earnestness and with integrity for self- enrichment. 

The university at present has (approx.) 62 colleges affiliated to it. The total enrollment of students in UTDs, University College and Affiliated Colleges crosses 42000. 24 Teaching Departments in the University offers 37 academic programmes under budgeted mode and Self Financing System and the University College offers five UG Programmes in the area of Technology, Management, Commerce, Law, Journalism and Mass Communication, Humanities, Social Sciences, Science and Education. Well-known, reputed and experienced academicians and professionals have been associated in preparing the academic curriculum of different programmes as per the guidelines of the UGC and other regulatory bodies. Teachers of the university have wide national and international exposure. 

The emphasis is to impart quality education by providing congenial and liberal atmosphere in the campus through the promotion of extracurricular activities. Sports events at university, state, North Zone and All India Intervarsity level are organized. Students also participate in Youth Festivals at University, State, North Zone and All India level. NSS and Red Cross etc. provide scope for extension activities. Thus the university prioritizes to enable students achieve overall growth of their personality as professionals and humans. 

Vivekananda Library. There is a good stock of books and study material of high standard in the University library. The library has made tireless efforts to provide e links for studies to the teachers and students to facilitate teaching- learning when it was worst affected due to COVID 19 Research Journals of National and International repute are subscribed to promote quality research. The reading rooms in the University Library are open for students to study during night under normal conditions. 

The University has adopted innovative methods in conducting University examinations. The students of this University have shown commendable results in academics as well as co-curricular activities. With the present pace of progress already acquired, the University looks forward to having a promising future.

UNIVERSITY SCHOOL FOR GRADUATE STUDIES (USGS)

National Education Policy (NEP) -2020 has provided an impetus to the changing horizons of Higher Education. The University has established University School for Undergraduate Studies (USGS) in Teaching Block-IV (Dr. APJ Abdul Kalam Bhawan) in order to start new programmes for tuning ourselves to the latest state-of-the-art in Higher Education. UCGS will focus on Four Year Degree Programmes (FYDP) to strengthen the graduate studies especially on designing, developing, execution of market and industry oriented demand. To benefit students, society and faculty, the UCGS is destined to start undergraduate programmes based on Learning Outcomes Curriculum Framework and as per NEP-2020 such as: (i) B.Com. Banking & Insurance, (ii) B.Com. Fintech & Financial Markets, (iii) B.Com. Derivatives & Risk Management, (iv) B.Sc. Data Science, (v) B.Sc. Mathematics, (vi) B.Sc. Physics, (vii) B.A. Economics & Finance. In addition, there is a 1-year programme namely (viii) Bachelor of Library & Information Science (B.LIS).

The holistic development of the students to compete the changing scenario of the world in the 21st century is of prime importance. UCGS is committed to impart quality education comprising academic knowledge and technical skills to the students.

UNIVERSITY CENTRE FOR OUTREACH PROGRAMS AND EXTENSION (UCOPE)

Ambitious Metamorphosis of the University can be achieved by way of establishing a couple of Special Purpose Vehicles (SPVs); one of them is the University Centre for Outreach Programs and Extension (UCOPE) which has been recently established in Teaching Block-IV (Dr. APJ Abdul Kalam Bhawan) of the university.

The COPE envisions to use education and technology for:

 Inculcating basic skills among students; 
 Facilitating avenues for training and placement of the students; 
 Conducting Outreach and Extension programmes by undertaking training and consultancy services; 
 Setting up Centres for focus areas like Gender Studies, Rural Development etc. and Chairs in the name of Celebrated leaders. 
 All activities that have hitherto called extracurricular and co-curricular, the academic aspects of such activities will be managed by UCOPE.

The Centre will fill up the gap of skill enrichment and university extension and outreach endowment as desired by NEP-2020.

CENTRE FOR RURAL STUDIES (CRS)

Chaudhary Devi Lal University Sirsa is located in the rural hinterland and therefore considered to be educationally backward. The economic life of the university's catchment area in the Sirsa and Fatehabad districts (the colleges of these districts are affiliated to this University) of Haryana state, Bhatinda, Mansa and Barnala districts of Punjab state and Hanumangarh and Sri Ganga Nagar districts of Rajasthan primarily dependents upon on agriculture activities. The university's rural demographic character necessitates conducting and promoting studies in rural affairs. Thus, the rationale for setting up the Centre for Rural Studies. The Centre will be headed by a Director (equivalent to the rank of Professor and should have experience of rural affairs related research studies) with adequate staff and own office. The UCRS will:

a) Prepare, develop and deliver academic programs focusing on rural affairs. 

b) Promote research in rural affairs. 

c) Institute award for excellent research work in rural affairs. 

d) Conduct training programs for elected representatives of PRIs and officials engaged in delivering services to rural people or engaged in rural development.

VIVEKANANDA LIBRARY

Vivekananda Library came into existence in the year 2003. At present, it has an impressive four storey building. The present building of library is easily approachable. Beautiful lawns, add to its grandeur. Special attention is given to the facilities of drinking water, light system and security system. Fully A.C. Reading Hall, Computer Lab and Periodical Section. All the reading areas of the Library are spacious, peaceful and furnished with comfortable furniture. The Library is having rich collection of publications which include books, journals, thesis/dissertations, reports, newspapers and magazines etc.

The Library at present has a total collection of 97149 books, 112+ Wiley 908 e-journals package, 11 Magazines and 15 newspapers to cater to the needs of the users. The Library also provides Reference Books including Encyclopedia, Dictionary etc. The SC/DSC/ST Book Bank with collection of 2269 books exists in the library for SC/DSC/ST students of various departments. The facility of online Journals and database is being provided to the users by INFLIBNET through UGC Infonet Digital Library Consortium Shodh Sindhu. Inter Library Loan facility is also available through DELNET. The Wi-Fi internet connectivity is available in the Library for easy access of internet services. Further, there is an access to E-books within University campus. The concept of fully computerized Library is adopted and is in process.

HOSTELS

At present, there are five hostels-three for girls (Capacity 300) and two for boys (Capacity 264), namely, Harki Devi Bhawan (Girls‘ Hostel-I), Kalpana Chawla Bhawan (Girls‘ Hostel-II), Savitri Bai Phulle Bhawan (Girls‘ Hostel-III), Lala Lajpat Rai Bhawan (Boys‘ Hostel-I) and Sardar Patel Bhawan (Boys‘ Hostel-II). One more Hostel for the Boys is under construction. All the five hostels have been provided with tube/LED lights and ceiling fans in every room. Solar panels are also installed at roof top of all these hostels. Electric geysers have been installed in bathrooms. Water coolers with RO system have also been provided. The hostels subscribe several national & regional dailies and magazines for enabling the students to know what is happening around the world. The facility of 32‖ Plasma TVs along with Dish/DTH facility has been provided in common rooms of all the hostels. Full A.C. reading hall is available for all girls in Girls Hostel-III open 24/7 hours. Medical facilities to all hostel residents are provided through the university Health Centre located in University premises. Besides, one Medical consultant and one ANM have been engaged look after the girls.

The Chief Warden, along with all Wardens, make every possible effort to see that the students get a cleaner surrounding within and outside the hostel premises, get hygienic food and always respond to the complaints of hostel residents in a positive manner.

A total number of 38 benches (three-seater) each has been provided in the premises of Girl‘s and Boy‘s Hostels separately. In the premises of both Girls Hostels, two separate lawns have been developed and Badminton Courts has also been constructed in all the five hostels. In Girls‘ Hostels, the facility of Table Tennis & Badminton and in Boys‘ Hostels, the facility of Table Tennis, Badminton and Volleyball has also been provided. The Gymnasium facility has been provided in the Hostels.

UNIVERSITY IT & DATA CENTRE (UCC & WEBSITE OFFICE)

1. Computer Lab: Two Computer Labs (UCC) with plenty number of desktops, adequate furniture and sufficient power backup, have been established on the top floor of Vivekananda Library to facilitate the research scholars, students and the staff members as per their requirements.

2. University Website: The University Website (www.cdlu.ac.in) is being maintained and updated efficiently, effectively & promptly by the University Website Office, being very descriptive and useful, the number of global visitors on website is increasing very rapidly.

3. Social Media: The social media pages/accounts i.e. facebook, tweeter, LinkedIn have been created for sharing the required day-to-day activities & important information and linked with University Website at the tab “follow us”.

4. Online Admission: The University is going to start online admission under various courses of University Teaching Department (UTDs) from the Session 2021-2022.

EDP CELL

The following project/tasks are being handled by the Electronic Data Processing (EDP) Cell.

ˉ University has signed Memorandum of Understanding (MoU) with Haryana Knowledge Corporation Limited (HKCL) on 08.11.2016 for the implementation of Digital University Framework (DUF) in the University w.e.f. session 2017-18. The web-link named cdlu.digitaluniversity.ac has been started/activated in this regard.

ˉ The Android based application (mobile app) named ―CDLU e-suvidha‖, is being handled by the EDP Cell and is available to download by the students free of cost at ―Google Play Store‖.

SC/ST CELL

The SC/ST Cell has been established to provide facilities to the SC/ST students of the University as per the instructions of UGC/State Govt. from time to time. SC/ST Cell functions as grievances Redressal Cell to redress the grievances of SC/ST Students and Employees of the university, and renders them necessary help in solving their academic as well as administrative problems. It also carries out any other work assigned from time to time so as to promote higher education among these communities, suffering from economic, social and education deprivations.

The main objective of the SC/ST Cell is to ensure proper implementation of various schemes of University Grants Commission/Govt. of India/State Govt. introduced from time to time in the interest of such students.

THE UGC CELL FOR COACHING SCHEMES FOR SC, ST, OBC (NON-CREAMY LAYER) AND MINORITIES

The University had established the UGC Cell for Coaching Schemes for SCs, STs, OBCs (Non Creamy Layer) and Minorities. General candidates holding BPL Cards (Below Poverty Line). The Cell implemented the following coaching schemes:-

1. Remedial Coaching

2. Coaching for Entry into Services

3. Coaching for NET/SET

Now the university is continuing this project on its own concentrating on the third of the above three objectives.

WELFARE SCHEMES FOR SC/DSC/BC STUDENTS

The University ensures proper implementation of various schemes of the UGC/Government of India/State Government concerning admission, scholarship etc. for the welfare of the students of reserved categories. The guidelines as revised from time to time by the Central and State Governments are displayed on the Notice Boards, prominent places and in the University prospectus for the benefit of the students belonging to SC/DSC/BC category. The guidelines are strictly adhered to. Apart from Post-Matric Scholarship for SC/DSC/BC students, the State Merit Scholarship for students with Physical Disabilities are also offered.

CAREER AND COUNSELING CELL

A Career and Counseling Cell has been established in the University to address the diverse socio-economic handicaps, linguistic differences and geographic backgrounds of the heterogeneous population of students coming to the University vis-à-vis equity of access and placement opportunities through availability of appropriate institutional support information. The Career and Counseling Cell also helps the students by providing appropriate guidance to establish linkages with the world of work and locate career opportunities. This cell is actively involved in carrying out vocational guidance and campus based interviews. The following are the major objectives of the cell:

 To gather information on job avenues and placements in different institutions and concerns related to the Programme(s) offered by this University.
 To analyze information in the local, regional and national contexts to explore its relevance and utility for the students in their placements and on job-training.
 To organize Seminars and Guidance Workshops for informing the students about the emerging Professional Trends and Events, job profiles, leadership roles, entrepreneurship, market needs and risks and implementation of national socio-economic policies and to impart training in soft skills.
 To promote discipline, healthy outlook and positive attitudes for strengthening National Integration and removal of narrow provincial preferences and prejudice.

UNIVERSITY SCIENCE INSTRUMENTATION CENTRE

Recently, University Science Instrumentation Centre (USIC) has been established in CV Raman Bhawan (Science Block) of the University. It will work as Central Instrumentation Lab with necessary and sufficient sophisticated equipments of scientific importance within the reach of faculty members as well as research scholars for research activities. In addition, it will provide service for the maintenance of scientific instruments as far as possible.

INTERNAL QUALITY ASSURANCE CELL (IQAC)

The University has constituted the Internal Quality Assurance Cell (IQAC) to instil the momentum of quality consciousness and continuous assessment and improvement. The cell works to develop a quality system of conscious, consistent and catalytically programmed action for improving the academic and administrative performance of the HEIs and to promote measures for institutional functioning towards quality enhancement through internalization of quality culture and institutionalization of best practices. The IQAC achieved the above said goals by offering itself the National Assessment and Accreditation Council (NAAC) for inspection. Grade from NAAC is considered Hall Mark of the quality of any HEI. The University has been Accredited with Grade ―B‖ valid for a period of five years from 14.09.2015. The cell is working towards second cycle of assessment and is dedicated towards continuous quality enrichment.

DEAN STUDENTS’ WELFARE

This office is actively involved in issuing bus passes to the daily passenger students and organizes the events like:

ˉ Awareness Campaign on HIV/AIDS.

ˉ Free Health Awareness/Checkup Camp.

ˉ Educational and Industrial Tours to different places.

ˉ It helps the University Teaching Departments students to participate in Inter College tournaments and Inter University tournaments in various games.

ˉ Group Insurance to the students.

DIRECTORATE OF YOUTH WELFARE

Cultural activities were undertaken to strengthen the awareness of the cultural heritage and foster positive values of goal setting, patience and perseverance, competitiveness and mutual cooperation, and coordination in the students of UTDs and affiliated colleges. The directorate celebrates all important days such as Independence Day, Republic Day, National Youth Day, Martyrdom Day and International Women‘s Day to commemorate the sacrifices of our warriors and to motivate the students for patriotism. The directorate organizes Talent Hunt Competition in the beginning of the academic session to identify and to motivate the students to take part in different cultural activities such as Dance, Theatre, Music, Literary and Fine Arts. Further the directorate organizes University Youth Festival in the month of October/November in all events notified by Association of Indian Universities (AIU).

SPORTS COUNCIL

Sports activities of the University are being run under the Sports Council. The University has following playfields: Handball (1), Football (1), Volleyball (2), Netball (1), Korfball (1), Kho-Kho (1), Kabaddi (1), Wrestling (1), Basketball (2), Judo (1), Athletic Track & Multipurpose Hall for indoor sports activities and Gym (female & male).

The University is providing following Sports Facilities:

 TA/DA during Inter University Tournaments.

 Free Sports Kit and Track Suits to the players participating in Inter University Tournaments.

 Scholarship/Prize money to the players winning positions in Inter University Tournaments is given as under:-

1. 1st Position Rs. 28,000/-

2. 2nd Position Rs. 24,000/-

3. 3rd Position Rs. 21,000/-

UNIVERSITY HEALTH CENTRE

The university Health Centre located in the Shopping Complex on the 1st floor from room no. 101-104. It has sufficient place for OPD, dispensary and inward. It has facility of consultation, medicines & laboratory tests, treatment at free of cost. There is an Ambulance to carry the sick students to referral hospitals. The Health Centre provides its services during games, physical efficiency tests and functions organized by university. The students, the employees & their dependents of the university are availing the medical facilities being provided by the University Health Centre.

YOUTH RED CROSS

Youth are the pillars and future leaders of the country. Today‘s youth is tomorrow‘s India. The Youth Red Cross, the youngest wing of India Red Cross Society, Haryana State Branch is active at the University Level. A Youth Red Cross Unit is working in the University Campus for this purpose. A fifteen member YRC Committee of CDLU, Sirsa has been constituted under the chairmanship of the Vice-Chancellor to promote the YRC activities in all the colleges/institutions within the jurisdiction of the university. Meeting of Executive Committee at University Level and of students volunteers are called from time to time to decide about the YRC future plans.

DEAN OF RESEARCH

Dean of Research makes efforts to plan activities and take adequate measures for promotion of research in the University. New ordinances are prepared and the old ones are amended as per requirement and in compliance of the U.G.C. guidelines to achieve qualitative enrichment in research. The office aims to launch schemes for in-house proposal of research projects. Of late it has also started the initiative of stimulating the process of various fellowships in the University for Timely Dispensation of cases.

RTI CELL

The RTI Cell deals with RTI applications and RTI appeals on behalf of the University under the provision of the RTI Act and provides information to the information seekers.

ANTI RAGGING COMMITTEE

Anti-Ragging Committee supported by Anti Ragging Squad and a Nodal Officer ensures that there are no incidences of ragging, bullying and baiting of new students on the campus. Ragging is a criminal offence and is strictly prohibited in the University. A student, if affected, can approach the Nodal Officer to redress his complaint. The Committee comprises Proctor, Dean Student‘s Welfare, Chief Wardens, Director Youth Welfare, Assistant Dean Students‘ Welfare and Hostel Wardens are also members of the Anti Ragging Committee/ Squad/Cell. The Anti Ragging Committee also has some outside members prominent along whom are SDM and DSP head quarter Sirsa besides some other important citizen of Sirsa.

ANTI EVE-TEASING COMMITTEE

EVE-teasing is a criminal offence. Making unwanted gestures towards girls or passing offensive comments are not only immoral acts but also subject to penal action under Indian Penal Code. Boys student are advised not to indulge in such acts. University has an Anti-Eve teasing Committee headed by the Vice-Chancellor. The Committee comprises Dean Academic Affairs, Proctor, Chief Warden, Dean Students Welfare, Dean of Colleges, Controller of Examination, Lady Warden, SDM Sirsa, City Magistrate, Sirsa, DSP (HQ), Sirsa, SHO (City), Sirsa besides some student representatives and important citizens are also its members.

WOMEN COMPLAINTS COMMITTEE

As per the Gazette of India University Grants Commission (Prevention, prohibition and redressal of sexual harassment of women employees and students in higher educational institutions) Regulations, 2015.

In exercise of the powers conferred by clause (g) of sub-section (1) of section 26 of the University Grants Commission Act, 1956 (3 of 1956), read with sub-section (1) of Section 20 of the said Act, the University Grants Commission hereby makes the regulations. Ch. Devi Lal University has constituted the Women Complaints Committee for women employees and girls students against sexual harassment.

CONSTRUCTION BRANCH

Kurukshetra University Chaudhary Devi Lal Post Graduate Regional Centre Sirsa was set up during the year 2000. Later on in April 2003 it was declared as full-fledged University named as CDLU, Sirsa. The University had been recognized by the University Grants Commission and declared eligible for Central Assistance under Section 12 (B) of UGC Act vide UGC letter no. F.9-17/2003 (CPP-1) dated 17.02.2009. The works construction of Boys Hostel No. 2, Girls Hostel No. 2, V.C. residence, Guest House has been started and completed by the University.

In addition to above, houses of H, C, D, E, F & E-II categories, Water Treatment Plant, Over Head Service Reservoir, Boundary Wall on undisputed land, Commissioning of Water Supply and Sewage Scheme, OHSR, STP and other development works were taken in hand by the construction wing of CDLU, Sirsa & completed. The prestigious works of Teaching Block No. II (Science Block), Media Centre, Sewage Treatment Plant, Library Building, Shopping complex, Main Gate, Internal Roads (Phase-II) & Parking, Construction of 6 Nos. C & 4 Nos. D Type & 3 Nos. F-type houses, Construction of Multipurpose Hall, Block ―A‖ of Administrative Block, Air Conditioning Plant at MP Hall and Sound Reinforcement System at MP Hall, Construction of 11 KV Indoor Electric main Sub Station and Compact Sub Station, various types of more residential houses i.e. C, E & F type houses Laying of sport Flooring at MP Hall, Construction of Water storage tank and providing sprinkler system in lawns, Construction of Day Care Centre, Solar Power plant & Solar Water Heating system have also been completed, The major construction projects ― Construction of Girls Hostel No. 3 & Teaching block No. III‖ have also, been completed. All the departments of science stream such as Physics, Chemistry, Bio-Technology, Mathematics, Food Science & Technology, Energy & Environmental Sciences are being run in the Teaching Block No. II i.e. C.V. Raman Bhawan (Science Block). Medical facility is made available to the students and employees of the University through its Health centre. The various types of shops such as drycleaner, ladies & gents parlour, confectionery photography, cyber café and stationery are being run in the building of University Shopping Complex. University Health centre & branch of Punjab National Bank with ATM is available at the University Shopping Complex. Silent Generator sets are also available in the University to meet out the requirement of power during poser failure.

The construction projects ―Construction of Administrative Block (Block B, C), Construction of Teaching Block No. 4, Establishment of Herbal Park, construction of Information Centre & Guidance Bureau, construction of Seminar Hall & Class Room and Extension of Boys Hostel No. 1, Statue of Chaudhary Devi Lal Ji, former Deputy Prime Minister of India, Beautification and renovation of Rotary in front of main gate of University, Solar Power plant etc. have been completed. The fresh proposals i.e. teaching Block No. 5, Construction of University College, Building for the Deptt. of Physical Education, Construction of University Wall, construction of Incubation Centre, solid Waste Management plant fire fighting system for the University, solar Water Heater for BH-1, Building for University Data Centre. Construction of Museum, Shopping complex, Reading Halls near Library, Teachers club and Transit Hostel etc. are in pipeline.

UNIVERSITY CENTRE FOR DISTANCE LEARNING (UCDL)

To cater to the needs of those students who could not able to be a part of regular admission and for the benefits of students of far-flung/unreached areas, the University established the University Centre for Distance Learning in 2006. UCDL offers various job-oriented courses through Distance Education Mode. University Centre for Distance Learning (UCDL) has planned to meet the challenges of the time and growing requirements of the people of the area. The UCDL offers several courses through distance mode such as Bachelor of Computer Application (BCA), Bachelor of Arts (Mass Communication), Bachelor of Arts (General) (B.A.), Bachelor of Commerce (B.Com), Master of Business Administration (MBA), Master of Computer Applications (MCA), Master of Arts (Mass Communication, English, Education, Punjabi, Hindi, Sanskrit, History) Master of Science (Computer Science), Master of Commerce (M.Com), Post Graduate Diploma in Computer Applications (PGDCA), Post Graduate Diploma in Business Management (PGDBM), Post Graduate Diploma in Mass Communication (PGDMC) and Diploma in Computer Science & Technology (DCST). The Distance Education Bureau has recognized the courses run by University Centre for Distance Learning vide its letter(s) No. F.No.1-6/2018 (DEB-I) dated 03.10.2018 and F.No.103-1/2017 (DEB-IV) dated 10.10.2018 which can be seen on UGC/DEB website. UCDL aims to provide the quality education at the door step of the learners as per the policy of the Government to give education to the deprived.

PROMINENT FEATURES

 Affordable Fee for the students.

 Bilingual programmes in Hindi and English with study material in English except otherwise intimated.

 Distance Education by using technology in selected subjects.

 Standard study material.

 The University Centre for Distance Learning holds Personal Contact Programmes (PCP).

 To provide the syllabus and study material after admission of the students.

 Punctuality in the conduct of examinations and declaration of results.

 No Migration Certificate is required for taking admission in Open and Distance Learning programme of CDLU, Sirsa and no Migration Certificate will be issued by the University after the completion of the course.

 The UCDL has appointed well qualified teachers and they remains available in UCDL Library for student‘s related queries/doubts on all working days.

According to the latest guidelines of the UGC the students can pursue two degrees one in regular mode and the other through distance mode.

TEACHING DEPARTMENTS OF UNIVERSITY COLLEGE

There are 05 Teaching Departments in the University College. Well-known, reputed and experienced academicians and professionals have been associated in preparing the academic curriculum of different programmes. It is important to mention here that special attention has been given to follow the guidelines of the UGC and other regulatory bodies in preparing the programme curriculum. The emphasis is to impart quality education by providing congenial and liberal atmosphere in the campus through the promotion of extracurricular activities. More emphasis are laid down on the learning outcomes and the development of cognitive and streaming students.

NATIONAL SERVICE SCHEME

National Service Scheme (NSS) is a noble experiment in academic expansion. It inculcates the spirit of voluntary work among the students and teachers through sustained community interactions. It brings out academic institutions closer to society. It shows how to combine knowledge and action to achieve results, which are desirable for community development. National Service Scheme at University College has been established with the objective of providing students with an opportunity to develop their overall personality by taking part in various Social Service Schemes.

FACILITIES

 The University College Library has a total number of collection of 393 books.

 Water coolers with RO system installed.

 All rooms are well furnished with furniture, lecture stand, white board, tube lights and ceiling fans.

 Secure and Safe environment.

 Lush green campus.

 Fully Wi-Fi Campus.

Faculty

Teaching departments

External links

Chaudhary Devi Lal University homepage

Universities in Haryana
Sirsa, Haryana
Educational institutions established in 2003
2003 establishments in Haryana